Giovanni de Sanctis (born 1949) is an Italian astronomer and discoverer of minor planets at the Osservatorio Astronomico di Torino (Astronomical Observatory of Turin) in Turin, Italy. His name is sometimes spelt DeSanctis, particularly in the Minor Planet Circulars. The Minor Planet Center credits him with the discovery of 42 numbered minor planets, most of which he discovered at ESO's La Silla site in northern Chile in the early 1980s.

The Vestian asteroid 3268 De Sanctis was named by Henri Debehogne in honor of his co-discoverer. Naming citation was published on 22 June 1986.

List of discovered minor planets

References 
 

 Piero Bianucci, Alba il 13 novembre sarà gemellata con un pianetino, La Stampa: Il Cielo, 2009-11-11

20th-century Italian astronomers
Discoverers of asteroids

Living people
1949 births